Daniel Handling (born 6 February 1994) is a Scottish footballer who plays for Scottish League One side Edinburgh City. Handling has previously played for Hibernian and Dumbarton as well as Berwick Rangers and Raith Rovers on loan.

Early life
Handling grew up in Haddington, East Lothian, and attended Knox Academy . His brother, Darren, plays as an attacking midfield player for Dunbar United.

Career
He made his first-team debut for Hibs as a substitute against Aberdeen on 14 May 2011, becoming the fourth-youngest person to play for Hibs. Handling agreed a new contract with Hibs later that year.

Handling was loaned to Third Division club Berwick Rangers in March 2012. He scored two goals on his Berwick debut, a 2–1 win at Peterhead on 24 March. He scored six goals in his first four games for the club, which gave Berwick a chance of qualifying for the end of season playoffs.

Handling made 24 appearances for the Hibs first team in the 2014–15 season, scoring three goals. He then missed all of the 2015–16 season due to suffering a knee injury in a pre-season game. Handling was an unused substitute in a 2016–17 UEFA Europa League tie with Brondby, but then suffered another injury. This prevented him from playing until late January, when he appeared in a development squad match. On 31 March, Handling moved to Raith Rovers on an emergency loan deal.

Having negotiated his release from Hibernian, Handling joined Scottish Championship side Dumbarton in July 2017. He scored his first goal for the club (and first since December 2014) in the semi-final of the Scottish Challenge Cup against Welsh Champions The New Saints in February 2018. After 23 appearances and three goals he turned down a new deal to join Scottish League Two side Edinburgh City. Handling signed a new two-year contract with Edinburgh City in June 2020.

Career statistics

Honours

Player
Hibernian
Scottish Cup winners: 2015–16
Scottish League Cup runners-up: 2015–16

References

External links

Daniel Handling profile at Scottish FA official website

1994 births
Living people
People from Haddington, East Lothian
People educated at Knox Academy
Scottish footballers
Association football forwards
Hibernian F.C. players
Berwick Rangers F.C. players
Scottish Premier League players
Scottish Football League players
Footballers from East Lothian
Scottish Professional Football League players
Scotland under-21 international footballers
Scotland youth international footballers
Raith Rovers F.C. players
Dumbarton F.C. players
F.C. Edinburgh players
Civil Service Strollers F.C players